Private Practice was the sixth album by Dr. Feelgood, and was released in October 1978.

This was commercially rewarding when the album spawned a Top 10 hit single (the only one of their career) in "Milk and Alcohol". Their preceding single release, "Down at the Doctors", which also appeared on Private Practice 's track listing, topped out at number 48 in the same UK Singles Chart.

The album peaked at number 41 in the UK Albums Chart on the 7 October 1978, and remained in that chart for five weeks.

Track listing
"Down at the Doctors" (Mickey Jupp) (3:19)
"Every Kind of Vice" (Lee Brilleaux, Gypie Mayo) (3:27)
"Things Get Better" (Eddie Floyd) (2:51)
"Milk and Alcohol" (Nick Lowe, Gypie Mayo) (2:55)
"Night Time" (Bob Feldman, Jerry Goldstein, Richard Gottehrer) (5:26)
"Let's Have a Party" (Jessie Mae Robinson) (2:42)
"Take a Trip" (Lee Brilleaux, Gypie Mayo) (4:25)
"It Wasn't Me" (Nick Lowe, Gypie Mayo) (3:06)
"Greaseball" (Gypie Mayo) (3:55)
"Sugar Shaker" (Lee Brilleaux, Gypie Mayo, John B. Sparks) (4:45)

Personnel
Dr. Feelgood
Lee Brilleaux - vocals, guitar, harmonica
John B. Sparks - bass guitar, backing vocals
 Gypie Mayo - guitar
The Big Figure (John Martin) - drums
Technical
 Richard Gottehrer - producer
Paul Henry - artwork and design
Aldo Bocca - engineer
 Martin Rushent - producer, mixing
Gary Edwards - engineer, mixing
 Keith Morris - photography

References

1978 albums
United Artists Records albums
Albums produced by Richard Gottehrer
Albums produced by Martin Rushent
Dr. Feelgood (band) albums